Huntington is an unincorporated community located in Putnam County, Florida, United States. It is located along Putnam County Road 308 west of Crescent City, Florida.

References 

Unincorporated communities in Putnam County, Florida
Unincorporated communities in Florida